Chris is the second studio album by French singer Christine and the Queens, released on 21 September 2018 in both English and French versions through Because Music. It was preceded by the release of two singles, each of which were released in both English and French versions: "Girlfriend" / "Damn, dis-moi", featuring Dâm-Funk, and "Doesn't Matter" / "Doesn't Matter (Voleur de soleil)". An English-language single, "5 Dollars", was also released alongside an S&M-inspired video, followed by the French version of "La Marcheuse".

On iTunes and other online streaming and download services, the album includes 23 tracks, with 11 in English and 12 in French, most of which are versions of the same song. The album is available physically in individual French and English versions and sets including both.

Background
Although still credited to Christine and the Queens, Héloïse Letissier explained before the album's release that he had adopted the simplified moniker Chris, saying "it had to be Chris at some point because I was bolder and stronger and had more muscle [...] it was natural for me to shed the rest of the stage name and to cut my hair."

Music and themes
In a track-by-track interview with Letissier, Pitchfork said the album "bounces from horny consumerism to melancholic machismo to stark vulnerability". It contrasted Chris with Letissier's debut album Chaleur humaine, saying that album's "warmth was slow-burning, [while] Chris is red hot, sweaty, and insatiable". Letissier later elaborated: "The first album was born out of the frustration of being an aberration in society, because I was a young queer woman. The second was really born out of the aberration I was becoming, which was a powerful woman—being lustful and horny and sometimes angry, and craving for this will to just own everything a bit more and apologise a bit less."

The Fader stated the album is "less starry-eyed than its predecessor", calling the lyrics more direct and sharp than before. It also claimed the album "explodes" Letissier's queer, feminist identity. Letissier named some of his references for the album were "immediate, catchy pop productions" by the likes of Cameo and Jimmy Jam and Terry Lewis, also specifically naming Michael Jackson's Dangerous and Janet Jackson's The Velvet Rope as influences. The track "Goya Soda" references the Spanish painter Francisco Goya.

Critical reception

Chris received widespread acclaim from music critics. At Metacritic, which assigns a normalised rating out of 100 to reviews from mainstream critics, the album received an average score of 89, based on 26 reviews, signifying "universal acclaim". Robert Steiner of The Boston Globe called the album a "refreshing, empowering record" and complimented its "stellar production and contagiously danceable jams", as well as Letissier's "engrossing lyricism". Although he felt that the album "loses steam" in its second half, Steiner named "The Walker" as a highlight for its "poignant" portrayal of a victim of domestic violence. In her review for AllMusic, Heather Phares concluded that "As [he] examines what masculinity, femininity, strength, and vulnerability mean to [him], Christine has never sounded more exposed -- or in control. A triumph, Chris reaffirms just how masterfully [he] engages minds, hearts, and bodies."

Year-end lists

Decade-end lists

Track listing

Notes
 All English and French track titles, except "Goya Soda" / "Goya ! Soda !", are stylised in sentence case capitalisation.
 The French tracks "Bruce est dans le brouillard" and "Le G" have no English counterparts, while the English track "Feel So Good" has no French counterpart.

Personnel
Only English track titles listed, except for French-exclusive tracks.

Musicians
 Héloïse Letissier – arrangement, performance; drum programming , bass , Neuron , keyboards , Emu , harpsichord , drums , piano , additional synths 
 Cole M.G.N. – additional arrangement , drum programming , bass , Moog , drums , keyboards , additional drum programming , additional synths 
 Dâm-Funk – keytar , vocals , bass , drum programming 
 David Frank – keyboards , bass , piano 
 Marlon McClain – guitars 
 James Manning – bass 
 Lance Tolbert – bass 
 Daniel Aged – pedal steel 
 Bastien Doremus – additional drum programming 

Technical
 Manny Marroquin – mixing 
 Chris Galland – mix engineering
 Robin Florent – mix assistance
 Scott Desmarais – mix assistance
 Felix Rémy – recording assistance 
 Michael Tainturier – recording assistance 
 Chris Steffen – recording assistance 
 David Davis – engineering 
 Chab – mastering

Artwork
 Jamie Morgan – photos
 Tracy Ma – artwork
 Laurent Antoine – design
 Auriana Beltrand – design

Charts

Weekly charts

Year-end charts

Certifications

Notes

References

2018 albums
Because Music albums
Christine and the Queens albums
Albums produced by Cole M. Greif-Neill
Contemporary R&B albums by French artists
Disco albums by French artists